The Claroteidae are a family of catfish (order Siluriformes) found in Africa. This family was separated from Bagridae. However, the monophyly of the family is sometimes contested.

The 12 genera contain 86 known species of claroteids in two subfamilies, Claroteinae and Auchenoglanidinae. The subfamily Auchenoglanidinae is sometimes classified as a separate family Auchenoglanididae. This group was also often formerly placed in Bagridae. The monophyly of Auchenoglanidinae is uncontested; it contains the three genera Auchenoglanis, Parauchenoglanis and Notoglanidium.

Two commonly known species are the giraffe catfish, Auchenoglanis occidentalis, and the African big-eye catfish, Chrysichthys longipinnis.

Claroteids have  moderately elongated bodies, usually with four pairs of barbels, an adipose fin, and strong pectoral and dorsal fin spines.

References

 
Catfish families

Taxa named by Pieter Bleeker